The Institute for the Development of Enhanced Perceptual Awareness, also known as The Institute, is a film and television production/distribution studio founded by Scott Gardenhour and Michael Bay. It was founded in 2001.

Former producers and directors
Michael Bay
Scott Gardenhour
Prakash Varma
Oliver Castro
Marco Gentile
Rupert Smith
Tim Story
Ben Briand

Films produced
The Gentleman Shaver (2011)
The Reformed Troglodyte (2011)

Clients
The Institute has produced commercial works for Burger King, Budweiser, Mercedes Benz, Victoria's Secret, Audi, Hallmark, Coke, GM, Coors, Goodby, Silverstein & Partners, Weiden & Kennedy, TBWA/ Chiat/Day, BBDO

References

Companies based in Los Angeles
Film production companies of the United States
Mass media companies established in 2001
Michael Bay